The Deputy Secretary of the Central Commission for Discipline Inspection of the Communist Party of China is the deputy to the Secretary of the Central Commission for Discipline Inspection. Normally there are several people serving as deputy secretary at any given time. As a rule of thumb, the deputy secretaries of the CCDI are ranked at the same level as a minister of the state; however, if they also hold seats on the Secretariat of the Central Committee, as was the case with He Yong and Zhao Hongzhu, then they are ranked one level higher, as a deputy national leader.

Deputy Secretary of the Central Commission for Discipline Inspection (1949–1955)

Deputy Secretary of the Central Control Commission (1955–1966)

Second Secretary of the Central Commission for Discipline Inspection (1978–1985)

Secretary of the Central Commission for Discipline Inspection (1978–1987)

Deputy Secretary of the Central Commission for Discipline Inspection (1987–present)

Central Commission for Discipline Inspection